The University of Pikeville (UPIKE) is a private university affiliated with the Presbyterian Church (USA) and located in Pikeville, Kentucky. It was founded in 1889 by the Presbyterian Church and is located on a  campus on a hillside overlooking downtown Pikeville.

The university is home to the Kentucky College of Osteopathic Medicine, one of three medical schools in the state of Kentucky. The university confers associate, bachelor's, master's and doctorate degrees through its six academic divisions and one medical college; enrollment was 2,366 students in fall 2016.

History
The university was founded in 1889 by the Presbyterian Church as the Pikeville Collegiate Institute.  It operated on the primary, secondary and post-secondary levels, although its "college" offerings were not accredited and did not lead to a degree.

In 1909 the school was split into the Pikeville College Academy, which was a private school at the primary and secondary level, and Pikeville College, which was accredited as a junior college, offering the first two-years with an anticipation of students then transferring to another Presbyterian college for a degree.  In 1955 the school became a degree granting four-year college in its own right, and in 1957 the academy closed.

In 1997, the Pikeville College School of Osteopathic Medicine, now the University of Pikeville Kentucky College of Osteopathic Medicine, was established.  This makes the college one of the smallest colleges in the United States to have a medical school.

The purpose of the osteopathic medical school, while graduates are fully prepared to specialize in any medical field, is to train primary care physicians to fill the shortage of medical care in the rural section of Appalachia in which it is located.  Student recruitment is focused almost exclusively on students with a rural Appalachian background.  It is one of 29 osteopathic colleges in the country, and one of five in Appalachia.

On July 1, 2011, the school officially changed its name from "Pikeville College" to the "University of Pikeville".  Late in the same year, voices were raised in the Kentucky General Assembly in favor of converting the university into a state-supported school.  By the end of the following March, proponents abandoned their plans after deeming them politically impossible.

Campus

The University of Pikeville is located on a  hillside campus, overlooking Downtown Pikeville in Kentucky's Eastern Mountain Coal Fields region.

Academic buildings
 The Armington Learning Center – A building which houses all undergraduate math and science classes, undergraduate labs, various faculty offices, Chrisman Auditorium, the Chrisman Appalachian Research Institute. 
 The Administration Building – The Administration Building houses the College of Education.
 The Allara Library – Dedicated in 1991, the Allara Library contains 3 floors of study rooms, books, a small cache of microfilm and microfiche, and the basement houses the University of Pikeville tutoring lab.  The Allara Library was remodeled from the old Pikeville Hospital.
 The Coal Building – This building houses the University of Pikeville Kentucky College of Osteopathic Medicine.
 Health Professions Building – This building houses the University of Pikeville Kentucky College of Optometry. Also, the building houses a Chick-fil-A and Einstein Bros. Bagels.
 Record Memorial – This building serves as a connection between Hambley Boulevard and University of Pikeville and also contains Booth Auditorium, the Sturgill Board Room, the Elizabeth Akers Nursing Program, the Marguerite Weber Art Gallery, and the Ridenour Dance Studio.
 Training-Academy Building – This is the oldest building on campus, and is listed on the National Register of Historic Places. It houses the Coleman College of Business.

Residential buildings
 Derrianna Hall – Has always been a female dorm and houses upperclassmen females only. 
 Condit Hall – Houses all freshman female students. The campus safety office is also located in Condit.
 Wickham Hall – Although originally a dorm for female campus residents it now houses all freshman males. The ground floor of the building holds the student lounge.
 Page Hall – Page Hall, like Wickham Hall, was originally a residence hall for female campus residents but now is a co-ed Hall and houses clubs and organizations that are registered with affinity housing. 
 The Kinzer Residential Center – Kinzer Hall houses both male and female upperclassmen campus residents.
 Spilman Hall – Located next to Page Hall, Spillman is a Co-Ed dorm that also hold handicap dorms on the first level.
 UPIKE South – Formerly a hotel, UPIKE South is the first off-campus housing and is only offered to graduate students.
 Gillispie Hall – Located next to Kinzer Hall, Gillispie Hall houses honor freshman student.
 College Square Residence Hall – is a co-ed hall located by the campus gym.

Student life and athletics
The Marvin Student Center – The building housed the campus bookstore, lounge, gameroom, post office, Upward Bound Program, and ROTC/National Guard Offices until it was demolished during the fall semester of 2010. A new building for the medical school called the Coal Building was built in its place.  The new $34 million educational facility was dedicated on September 15, 2012.

UPIKE's men's and women's basketball teams play at the 5,700-seat Appalachian Wireless Arena adjacent to the campus in downtown Pikeville. The Expo Center opened in 2005 and replaced the UPike Gym as the home of the men's and women's basketball teams, although the women's volleyball team still uses the gym. The facility has also hosted the Mid-South Conference basketball tournament.

Academics
The University of Pikeville award associate degrees, bachelor's degrees, master's degrees, and doctoral degrees. The university's Doctor of Osteopathic Medicine degree is awarded in collaboration with the University of Pikeville Kentucky College of Osteopathic Medicine and the Doctor of Optometry program began in 2016.

Athletics

The Pikeville (UPike) athletic teams are called the Bears. The university is a member of the National Association of Intercollegiate Athletics (NAIA), primarily competing in the Mid-South Conference (MSC) since the 2000–01 academic year. The Bears previously competed in the Kentucky Intercollegiate Athletic Conference (KIAC; now currently known as the River States Conference (RSC) since the 2016–17 school year) from 1958–59 to 1999–2000.

UPike competes in 25 intercollegiate varsity sports: men's sports include baseball, basketball, bowling, cross country, football, golf, soccer, swimming, tennis, track & field and wrestling; while women's sports include basketball, bowling, cross country, golf, soccer, softball, swimming, tennis, track & field and volleyball; and co-ed sports include archery, cheerleading, dance and eSports.

Accomplishments
Pikeville athletics have won numerous conference championships and three national championships: two in women's bowling in 2004 and 2008 and a NAIA DI men's basketball championship in 2011.

Notable alumni
 Kelly Coleman – All-American basketball player, all-time leading scorer in Kentucky High School history. Drafted #11 overall by the New York Knicks in the 1960 NBA draft.
 Walt Harris – former basketball player, current mixed martial artist for the UFC
 Donnie Jones – Graduated in 1988; former assistant and head basketball coach at Marshall University (1990–1996; 2007–2010, respectively) head basketball coach at University of Central Florida (2010-2016)and assistant basketball coach at the University of Florida (1996–2007), Wichita State 2017 and the University of Dayton 2018. He is currently the head basketball coach at the Stetson University.
 Judi Patton – Former First Lady of Kentucky. Wife of current university chancellor and former governor Paul E. Patton.
 John Paul Riddle – Graduated in 1920; Pioneer aviator and co-founder of the Embry-Riddle Aeronautical University.
 Will T. Scott – Former Justice of Kentucky's 7th Supreme Court District.
 E.J. Underwood – Former NFL, CFL, AFL and CIFL player.
 Grady Wallace – Attended in 1953–54 and 1954–55; went to the University of South Carolina afterward to play basketball and was named a consensus Second Team All-American and led the NCAA in scoring his senior season.

Presidents

See also

 List of Pikeville Bears head football coaches

Notes and references

External links
 Official website
 Official athletics website

 
Educational institutions established in 1889
Buildings and structures in Pike County, Kentucky
Universities and colleges affiliated with the Presbyterian Church (USA)
Universities and colleges accredited by the Southern Association of Colleges and Schools
Education in Pike County, Kentucky
1889 establishments in Kentucky
University of Pikeville
Pikeville
Pikeville, Kentucky